Yit Foh Coffee Factory Sdn Bhd (doing business as Yit Foh Tenom Coffee) is the main coffee producer in the state of Sabah, Malaysia since 1960. Founded by Mr. Yong Loong Vun in Kg. Chinta Mata on the district of Tenom, it is the oldest coffee company for Sabah. The company is owned by the Yit Foh Coffee Factory Sdn Bhd and is halal-certified.

History 
The company is one of the producer of Tenom coffee (Kopi Tenom) and recognised as the oldest operator has been operating since 1960. Founded by Mr. Yong Loong Vun in Kampung Chinta Mata of Tenom District, it still produce coffee grounds in traditional way by roasting coffee bean over woodfire to bring out the true aroma of coffee. Since been inherited by Alex Yong, a new factory was opened in 1993 and now is intend to expand the market globally. The biggest competitor of this company is the Fatt Choi Tenom Coffee, which also come from the same district although the company is recently established in 1986.

See also 
 List of coffee companies

References 

Coffee brands
Food and drink companies of Malaysia
Food and drink companies established in 1960
1960 establishments in North Borneo
Privately held companies of Malaysia
Malaysian brands
Coffee in Malaysia
Agriculture companies of Malaysia